The following lists of violinists are available:

 List of classical violinists, notable violinists from the baroque era onwards
 List of contemporary classical violinists, notable contemporary classical violinists
 List of violinist/composers, list of violinists who were also classical music composers
 List of jazz violinists, notable jazz violinists
 List of popular music violinists, popular music violinists
 List of Indian violinists, list of Indian violinists including Carnatic and Hindustani
 List of Persian violinists, names of famous Persian style violinists
 List of electric violinists
 List of fiddlers, fiddlers, all styles
 List of female violinists, sortable list of female classical violinists, in chronological order of birth

See also

Lists of musicians

References

External links

 
Violin